Popol Vuh, later known as Popol Ace, was a 1970s Norwegian progressive rock band from Oslo, that became popular in the 1970s Norwegian rock scene with such songs as "All We Have Is the Past", "Queen of all Queens" and "Music Box".

The band later changed its name to "Popol Ace" to avoid confusion with the German band Popol Vuh.

The band's downfall came with the lead singer Jahn Teigen leaving the band for a solo career.

Last line-up
Jahn Teigen – vocals
Pete Knutsen – guitar, keyboards
Arne Schulze – guitar
Terje Methi – bass
Thor Andreassen – drums and percussion
Pjokken Eide – flute, trombone

Discography
as Popol Vuh
1972 Popol Vuh, Polydor 2923 009 
1973 Quiche Maya, Polydor 2382 038
as Popol Ace
1975 Stolen From Time, Polydor 2480 332
1978 Curly Sounds, Polydor 2383 498
1994 Cat of 9 Tales, Polydor 523908-2 (compilation)
2003 All We Have, Universal/Polydor (albums 1-4 + 5th disc of rarities)
2006 The Best of Popol Ace, Universal (compilation)

External links

Norwegian progressive rock groups
Musical groups established in 1972
1972 establishments in Norway
Musical groups from Oslo
Musical groups with year of disestablishment missing